Dinklageodoxa is a monotypic genus of flowering plant belonging to the family Bignoniaceae. It contains just 1 species, Dinklageodoxa scandens Heine & Sandwith.

Its native range is Liberia in Africa.

The genus name of Dinklageodoxa is in honour of Max Julius Dinklage (1864–1935), a German merchant who collected plants in West Africa, and the Latin specific epithet scandens means "to climb".
It was first published by Heine & Sandwith in Kew Bull. Vol.16 on page 223 in 1962.

References

Bignoniaceae
Bignoniaceae genera
Plants described in 1962
Flora of Liberia
Flora of Africa